List of Guggenheim Fellowships awarded in 2016: Guggenheim Fellowships have been awarded annually since 1925, by the John Simon Guggenheim Memorial Foundation to those "who have demonstrated exceptional capacity for productive scholarship or exceptional creative ability in the arts."

See also
 Guggenheim Fellowship
 List of Guggenheim Fellowships awarded in 2015
 List of Guggenheim Fellowships awarded in 2017

References

2016
2016 awards
2016 art awards